Elegiac Cycle is a solo studio album by American pianist Brad Mehldau. The album was issued in 1999 by Warner Bros. produced by Mehldau himself.

French edition
In 2011, the French publisher Outre Mesure released in both English and French the complete transcription note for note of Elegiac Cycle, and some musical commentaries by Philippe André, the original manuscript “lead sheets” of Brad Mehldau and a long and recent interview by Ludovic Florin about the genesis of the record and where the musician stands with it now.

Track listing
All pieces composed by Brad Mehldau

"Bard" 2:45
"Resignation" 5:34
"Memory's Tricks" 9:17
"Elegy for William Burroughs and Allen Ginsberg" 4:43
"Lament for Linus" 1:27
"Trailer Park Ghost" 9:19
"Goodbye Storyteller (for Fred Myrow)" 10:27
"Rückblick" 8:56
"The Bard Returns" 4:16

Personnel
Primary artist
Brad Mehldau - piano, producer, liner notes

Production
Lawrence Azerrad – art direction, design
Alisha Chamberlain – assistant engineer 
Michael Davenport – executive producer, management 
Alan Yoshida – mastering
John Clark – photography
Bernie Kirsch – recording

References

1999 albums
Brad Mehldau albums
Solo piano jazz albums
Warner Records albums